Lännen lokari (eng: The Western Logger) is an American Finnish song written by Hiski Salomaa. Lännen lokari is one of Salomaa's most popular songs. The word "lokari" is a word in American Finnish, coming from the English word "logger". The song also contains many other English loanwords found in American Finnish. It is one of the most known American Finnish songs.

References

External links 
Lännen lokari at Yle areena

Finnish music